Raymond Durand may refer to:
 Raymond Durand (driver) (born 1952), French rally driver
 Raymond Durand (politician) (born 1945), French politician
 Raymond Durand (footballer) (1908–1989), French footballer
 Raymond Durand (sport shooter) (1894–1977), French Olympic shooter
 Louis Marie Raymond Durand (1786–1837), French diplomat, consul in Warsaw during the November Uprising